Renfrewshire North and West is a constituency of the Scottish Parliament (Holyrood). It elects one Member of the Scottish Parliament (MSP) by the first past the post method of election. It is also one of ten constituencies in the West Scotland electoral region, which elects seven additional members, in addition to ten constituency MSPs, to produce a form of proportional representation for the region as a whole.

The seat has been held by Natalie Don of the Scottish National Party since the 2021 Scottish Parliament election.

Electoral region 

The other nine constituencies of the West Scotland region are Clydebank and Milngavie, Cunninghame North, Cunninghame South, Dumbarton, Eastwood, Greenock and Inverclyde, Paisley, Renfrewshire South and Strathkelvin and Bearsden.

The region covers part of the Argyll and Bute council area, the East Dunbartonshire council area, the East Renfrewshire council area, the Inverclyde council area, North Ayrshire council area, the Renfrewshire council area and the West Dunbartonshire council area.

Constituency boundaries and council area 

Renfrewshire is represented in the Scottish Parliament by three constituencies: Paisley, Renfrewshire North and West and Renfrewshire South.

The Renfrewshire North and West constituency overlaps with the Inverclyde council area and uses the following electoral wards:

In full:
Renfrew North and Braehead
Renfrew South and Gallowhill
Bishopton, Bridge of Weir and Langbank
Erskine and Inchinnan
In part:
Inverclyde East (shared with Greenock and Inverclyde constituency)
Paisley Northwest (shared with Paisley constituency)
Houston, Crosslee and Linwood (shared with Renfrewshire South constituency)

Constituency profile 
BBC profile:

Member of the Scottish Parliament

Elections

2020s

2010s

References

External links

Politics of Renfrewshire
Scottish Parliament constituencies and regions from 2011
Constituencies of the Scottish Parliament
Constituencies established in 2011
2011 establishments in Scotland
Renfrew
Politics of Paisley, Renfrewshire
Politics of Inverclyde
Erskine, Renfrewshire